The Rosta is a river in the north of the Kola Peninsula in Murmansk Oblast, Russia. The Rosta originates in the Lake Rogozero and flows into the Kola Bay. The Rosta District of Murmansk takes its name from the river.

References

Rivers of Murmansk Oblast
Drainage basins of the Barents Sea